Government of Zimbabwe
2008 establishments in Zimbabwe
Cabinets established in 2008
Robert Mugabe